Gary Christenson may refer to:

 Gary Christenson (mayor), mayor of Malden, Massachusetts
 Gary Christenson (baseball) (born 1953), Major League Baseball pitcher